A list of films produced in France in 1945.

See also
 1945 in France

References

External links
 French films of 1945 at the Internet Movie Database
French films of 1945 at Cinema-francais.fr

1945
Films
French